Varatantu is a sage in Hinduism. He establishes a school of thought called Vāratantavīya.

Legend 
Varatantu is featured in the Skanda Purana, having a dialogue with Nandi with other sages.

The disciple of Varatantu, Kautsa, seeks money from the Raghu in the Raghuvamsha.

In regional tradition, he is believed to have had a large ashram in Bharuch for the education of children in the kingdom of the second Raghu, the grandfather of Rama.

See also
Bhrigu
Markandeya
Kapila

References

Rishis
Hindu mythology